Jörg Fisch (born April 28, 1947) is a Swiss historian. He studied history and philosophy in the University of Zurich and University of Basel.He did his Doctorate from the Heidelberg University.

References

1947 births
Living people